Neptis omeroda is a species of nymphalid butterfly found in Asia.

Subspecies
Neptis omeroda omeroda (Thailand, Malaya, Sumatra, Bangka, Borneo, Java)
Neptis omeroda infuscata Hagen, 1898 (Mentawai Island)
Neptis omeroda batunensis Fruhstorfer, 1912 (Batu Island)
Neptis omeroda kahoga Fruhstorfer, 1908 (Nias)

References

omeroda
Butterflies of Indochina
Butterflies of Borneo
Butterflies of Indonesia
Butterflies of Java
Lepidoptera of Malaysia
Lepidoptera of Thailand